The Yamaha TZ 350 was a racing motorcycle produced by the Yamaha Motor Company from 1973 to 1981 for competition in the Grand Prix motorcycle racing series. The motorcycle was powered by a 350 cc two stroke engine. 


Model history
Production of the motorcycle started in 1973 with Model A (60 bhp @9,500rpm) and ended 1981 with Model H (72 bhp @ 11,000rpm) when the GP series came to an end.

Production Racer were series manufactured racing bikes. Two Yamaha TZ 350 models are part of the motorcycle collection of the Technikmuseum Speyer.

Yamaha often leveraged the marketing of their RD and RZ series road motorcycles by referencing the TZ series. See also: RD250, RD350, RD400, RZ250, RZ350. The TZ motors provided the inspiration and engineering basis of Yamaha's contemporaneous road going two strokes.

References

External links 
The TZ 350 Website
Youtube Video of TZ 350 starting

TZ350
Grand Prix motorcycles